The Constitution of Victoria is the constitution of the state of Victoria, Australia. The current constitution, the Constitution Act 1975 was enacted in 1975, and has been amended several times.

Since 1901, Victoria has been a state of the Commonwealth of Australia, and its relationship with the Commonwealth is regulated by the federal Constitution of Australia. The jurisdiction of the Parliament of Victoria to make laws and the laws of Victoria are subject to limitations imposed by the Australian Constitution.

The Constitution is based on principles of the Westminster system of responsible government, as modified due to Victoria being a state within a federation of Australia.

History
The original Constitution of Victoria was drafted and approved in Melbourne in March 1854 by the first Victorian Legislative Council, and sent to Britain for assent. It was received in London in May 1854 and, after some opposition and delay, was approved (with some amendments) as an Act of the British Parliament in 1855. It was passed by the United Kingdom Parliament as the Victoria Constitution Act 1855, was granted Royal Assent on 16 July 1855 and was proclaimed in Victoria on 23 November 1855. The Constitution established the Westminster-style system of responsible government.

The 1855 Constitution, though an Act of the British Parliament, could be and was amended by the Victorian Parliament from time to time. Changes have included parliamentary membership numbers, voter eligibility, payment of members, voting methods, size of the ministry, electorate numbers and the powers and responsibilities of the Legislative Council and the Legislative Assembly, besides other matters.

In 1901, the Australian colonies, including Victoria, formed the Commonwealth of Australia which was constituted by the Australian Constitution. The jurisdiction of the Victorian Parliament to make laws and the laws of Victoria became subject to limitations imposed by the Australian Constitution.

On 22 October 1975 the Hamer Government proclaimed a new Constitution as an Act of the Parliament of Victoria to replace the 1855 Constitution.

In 2003, the 1975 Constitution was amended to entrench certain provisions, such as the representation of Victorian voters in Parliament, by requiring amendments to those provisions to require a referendum. The 2003 amendments also provided for fixed-four year terms for both Houses, election of the Legislative Council by proportional representation, removal of the Council's power to block a supply bill (the budget) and a dispute resolution process for bills for which agreement between the houses cannot be reached.

During the 2022 Victorian state election Labor Premier Daniel Andrews committed to amending the state’s constitution to protect public ownership of the revived State Electricity Commission if re-elected, to make it harder, although not impossible, for it to be privatised again in the future. Re-privatising the commission after such legislation would require a "special majority" of 60% of both the Legislative Assembly and Legislative Council, a situation which already exists for any potential privitisation of water services in Victoria under the Constitution of Victoria.

References

External links
Constitution Act 1975 on Victorian Legislation
CONSTITUTION ACT 1975 on Austlii
Victorian Parliament webpage about the Constitution
 Final Report of the Constitution Commission, Victoria, 2002, 'A House for our Future'

Victoria
Victoria (Australia) legislation